Superficial charm (or insincere charm) refers to the social act of saying or doing things because they are well received by others, rather than what one actually believes or wants to do. It is sometimes referred to as "telling people what they want to hear". Superficial charm is a generally effective way to ingratiate or persuade and it is one of the many elements of impression management/self-presention.

Flattery and charm accompanied by obvious ulterior motives is generally not socially appreciated, and most people consider themselves to be skilled at distinguishing sincere compliments from superficial, however, researchers have demonstrated that even obviously manipulative charm can be effective. While expressed attitudes are negative or dismissive, implicit attitudes are often positively affected. The effectiveness of charm and flattery, in general, stems from the recipient’s natural desire to feel good about one's self.

Superficial charm can be self damaging. The ability to be superficially charming often leads to success in areas like the theatre, salesmanship, or politics and diplomacy. In excess, being adept in social intelligence and endlessly taking social cues from other people, can lead to the sacrificing of one's motivations and sense of self.

Superficial charm can be exploitative. Individuals with antisocial personality disorder, for example, are known to have limited guilt or anxiety when it comes to exploiting others in harmful ways. While intimidation and violence are common means of exploitation, the use of superficial charm is not uncommon. Superficial charm is listed on the Hare Psychopathy Checklist.

References

Human behavior
Persuasion techniques
Conformity